Pride and Prejudice is a 1958 British television adaptation of the Jane Austen's 1813 novel of the same name, which aired on the BBC. Cast members included Alan Badel, Pamela Binns, Jane Downs, Susan Lyall Grant, Marian Spencer, Vivienne Martin, Hugh Sinclair, William Squire, Joan Carol, Jeanne Elvin, Colin Jeavons, Barbara New, and Greta Watson. Six half-hour episodes were produced, presumably aired live (since that was usually the case with BBC drama of the era), and telerecorded for overseas broadcast. All six episodes were subsequently junked and are believed to be lost.
The designer was Stephen Bundy.

Cast
Jane Downs as Elizabeth Bennet
Alan Badel as Mr. Darcy
Pamela Binns as Mary Bennet
Susan Lyall Grant as Jane Bennet
Marian Spencer as Mrs. Bennet
Vivienne Martin as Lydia Bennet
Hugh Sinclair as Mr. Bennet
William Squire as Mr. Bingley
Joan Carol as Mrs. Gardiner
Jeanne Elvin as Servant
Colin Jeavons as Mr. Wickham
Barbara New as Charlotte Lucas
Greta Watson as Caroline Bingley
Hamilton Dyce as Mr. Gardiner
Jack May as Mr. Collins
Phyllis Neilson-Terry as Lady Catherine de Bourgh
Robert Crewsdon as Colonel Fitzwilliam
Jeremy Geidt as Captain Denny
Hazel Hughes as Lady Lucas
Madoline Thomas as Mrs. Reynolds

Episodes

Reception
The series was exported to Australia where it was shown on ABC. A reviewer for The Australian Women's Weekly called it "delightful", said "for out-of-this-world entertainment I'll nominate Jane Austen", and praised the performances of Jane Downs and Alan Badel. A still photograph appeared in an earlier edition of the magazine.

References

External links
Pride and Prejudice on IMDb

1958 British television series debuts
1958 British television series endings
Lost BBC episodes
English-language television shows
1950s British drama television series
1950s British television miniseries
Black-and-white British television shows
Television series based on Pride and Prejudice